The firewood-gatherer (Anumbius annumbi) is a species of bird in the family Furnariidae. It is the only member of the genus Anumbius.

The firewood-gatherer is found in Argentina, Brazil, Paraguay, and Uruguay. Its natural habitats are subtropical or tropical seasonally wet or flooded lowland grassland, pastureland, and heavily degraded former forest.

Within the ovenbird family, the firewood-gatherer is genetically most closely related to the  lark-like brushrunner (Coryphistera alaudina). The firewood-gatherer is monotypic: no subspecies are recognised.

The firewood-gatherer is a brown bird with a long tail, streaked with darker brown, with a whitish eyestripe and some white on the tail. The strident call is uttered as a monotone chick-chick-chicl-chee-ee-ee-ee-ee. Both males and females vocalise, including from the nest.

It typically inhabits open, bushy countryside, pasture and cropland, and even relatively unvegetated areas with scattered thistles and clumps of foliage. It is quite bold, sitting on fencing posts or wires, and walking about inconspicuously on the ground. It usually occurs singly or in pairs, and only at the end of the breeding season can more than two birds be seen at one time. It feeds on insects, beetles, flies and their larvae, and seeds.

It got its name because it is frequently seen carrying sticks to its nest. The bulky nests are very durable and are used from year to year. The young from the first brood may be ejected from the territory, but may help raise the second brood.

References

Furnariidae
Birds of Brazil
Birds of Paraguay
Birds of the Pampas
Birds of Argentina
Birds described in 1817
Taxonomy articles created by Polbot
Taxa named by Alcide d'Orbigny
Taxa named by Frédéric de Lafresnaye
Taxa named by Louis Jean Pierre Vieillot